The Combined Services cricket team played first-class cricket between 1920 and 1964, featuring in 63 fixtures. The team was made up of cricketers who were serving in the three branches of the British Armed Forces: the British Army, Royal Navy, and Royal Air Force. Throughout the cricket season, the Combined Services regularly played against county opposition and touring sides. In the sides 63 first-class fixtures, 226 different cricketers appeared for the Combined Services. During the period of National Service, the Combined Services were often able to field a strong side of young players who were already associated with a first-class county. Following the formal end of National Service in the United Kingdom in 1960, the Combined Services invariably fielded weaker sides, having lost access to a pool of young county cricketers.

The details are the player's usual name followed by the years in which he played first-class matches for one of the sides and then his name is given as it would appear on a modern match scorecard.

<noinclude>

A
 Michael Ainsworth (1946–1948) : M. L. Y. Ainsworth
 David Allen (1955) : D. A. Allen
 Keith Andrew (1952) : K. V. Andrew
 Arthur Archdale (1920–1921) : A. S. Archdale
 William Ashmore (1948) : W. S. Ashmore
 Bill Atkins (1958–1959) : G. Atkins
 Graham Atkinson (1957–1958) : G. Atkinson

B

C

D

E
 Richard Earnshaw (1960–1961) : R. O. Earnshaw
 John Edrich (1956–1957) : J. H. Edrich
 Bernard Elgood (1948) : B. C. Elgood
 Alfred Evans (1920) : A. E. Evans

F
 John Fawkes (1959–1960) : J. Fawkes
 Maurice Fenner (1949–1964) : M. D. Fenner
 Godfrey Firbank (1922) : G. C. Firbank
 Eric Fisk (1950–1951) : E. Fisk
 Ronnie Ford (1946–1949) : W. R. Ford
 William Foster (1964) : W. J. Foster
 Robert St Leger Fowler (1921–1924) : R. S. Fowler

G
 Bob Gale (1955) : R. A. Gale
 David Gay (1949) : D. W. M. Gay
 Albert Gillespie (1937) : A. S. Gillespie
 Stephen Goldring (1964) : S. Goldring
 Adrian Gore (1924–1931) : A. C. Gore
 David Green (1956) : D. J. Green
 Bill Greensmith (1949–1950) : W. T. Greensmith
 Lancelot Grove (1937) : L. T. Grove
 David Guard (1947) : D. R. Guard

H

I
 Ray Illingworth (1952) : R. Illingworth
 Colin Ingleby-Mackenzie (1953) : A. C. D. Ingleby-Mackenzie

J
 Tom Jameson (1920–1924) : T. O. Jameson
 Julian Jefferson (1922) : J. A. D. Jefferson
 Johnnie Johnson (1947) : F. S. R. Johnson
 Peter Johnson (1950) : P. L. Johnson
 Alan Jones (1959) : A. Jones

K
 Don Kenyon (1946) : D. Kenyon 
 Simon Kimmins (1950) : S. E. A. Kimmins
 Barry Knight (1957–1958) : B. R. Knight

L
 Richard Langridge (1959–1960) : R. J. Langridge
 Michael Laws (1946) : M. L. Laws
 Stan Leadbetter (1956–1957) : S. A. Leadbetter
 Stuart Leary (1955–1956) : S. E. Leary
 Tony Lewis (1958–1959) : A. R. Lewis
 Albert Lightfoot (1955) : A. Lightfoot
 Joseph Lister (1951) : J. Lister
 Tony Lock (1948) : G. A. R. Lock
 Brian Luckhurst (1960) : B. W. Luckhurst
 Ian Lumsden (1948–1949) : I. J. M. Lumsden

M

N
 David Newsom (1960–1961) : D. J. Newsom

O
 Alan Oakman (1949) : A. S. M. Oakman
 Michael Osborne (1961–1962) : M. J. Osborne

P

R
 John Rawlence (1950) : J. R. Rawlence
 Alan Rayment (1947) : A. W. H. Rayment
 Harold Rhodes (1956) : H. J. Rhodes
 Peter Richardson (1954–1955) : P. E. Richardson
 Fred Roberts (1946–1949) : J. F. Roberts
 William Robins (1937) : W. V. H. Robins
 Keith Robinson (1961) : K. Robinson
 Maurice Robinson (1946) : M. Robinson
 Brian Roe (1959–1960) : B. Roe
 Francis Rogers (1924) : F. G. Rogers

S

T
 Anthony Thackara (1949–1955) : A. L. S. S. Thackara
 Joe Thewlis (1962) : J. Thewlis
 Roly Thompson (1952) : R. G. Thompson
 David Thorne (1964) : D. C. Thorne
 Edward Thornton (1922) : E. Thornton
 Fred Titmus (1951) : F. J. Titmus
 Gerry Tordoff (1953–1962) : G. G. Tordoff
 Fred Trueman (1953) : F. S. Trueman

U
 Arthur Underwood (1950–1951) : A. J. Underwood

V
 Geoffrey Vavasour (1947) : G. W. Vavasour
 John Vernon (1949–1952) : J. M. Vernon
 Roy Virgin (1961) : R. T. Virgin
 Bill Voce (1946) : W. Voce

W

Y
 Rex Yeatman (1946) : R. H. Yeatman

References

Combined Services